"Perfect Way" is a song written by Green Gartside and David Gamson and performed by British pop band Scritti Politti. It was featured on the band's second and most successful album, Cupid & Psyche 85, released in June 1985. The song features synthesizer in its instrumentation.

Chart performance
Four singles had already been released in the UK from the album before "Perfect Way" was issued in August 1985. It was only a minor hit in the UK (No. 48), but in the US "Perfect Way" became Scritti Politti's biggest hit, reaching No. 11 on the Billboard Hot 100.  On other US charts, "Perfect Way" reached No. 6 on the Hot Dance/Disco chart. The song was also a minor hit on the Hot Black Singles chart, where it peaked at No. 85.  It was also a Top 40 hit in Canada, reaching No. 32 on the RPM Singles chart.

The official music video, which mixes monochrome and colour footage, features musicians performing in the studio, intercut with close-up faces, video effects, and urban scenes, was directed by Paula Greif and Peter Kagan.

Charts

Weekly charts

Year-end charts

Cover versions
An instrumental version of the song was covered by Miles Davis on his 1986 album Tutu, providing a second success for the song in the US. The song entered Davis' live repertoire and he was recorded playing it live many times.

References

External links

1985 songs
1985 singles
Scritti Politti songs
Songs written by Green Gartside
Songs written by David Gamson
Song recordings produced by David Gamson
Virgin Records singles
Warner Records singles